The 1986 Espirito Santo Trophy took place 14–17 October at Lagunita Country Club in Caracas, Venezuela. It was the 12th women's golf World Amateur Team Championship for the Espirito Santo Trophy. The tournament was a 72-hole stroke play team event with 27 team entries, each with three players. The best two scores for each round counted towards the team total.

The Spain team won the trophy, earning the title for the first time, beating team France by three strokes. France earned the silver medal while the United States team took the bronze at third place one more stroke back.

Teams 
27 teams entered the event and completed the competition. Each team had three players.

Results 

Sources:

Individual leaders 
There was no official recognition for the lowest individual scores.

References

External links 
World Amateur Team Championships on International Golf Federation website

Espirito Santo Trophy
Golf tournaments in Venezuela
Espirito Santo Trophy
Espirito Santo Trophy
Espirito Santo Trophy